Silvanus (or Sylvanus) of Ahun is venerated as a martyr and saint.

According to the tradition, Silvanus was a deacon who was killed by Vandals at the battle of Agedunum or Acitodunum (Ahun) on 16 October 407.

Veneration 

The antiquity of his cult is based on the fact that there was an ancient tomb said to carry his relics; the tomb rests in the crypt of the 12th-century church of Saint-Silvain d’Ahun.  In a wood panel dating from 1639, he is depicted dressed in a dalmatic, bearing a book and a palm.

The following places carry Silvanus' name :
 Saint-Silvain-Bas-le-Roc
 Saint-Silvain-Bellegarde
 Saint-Silvain-Montaigut
 Saint-Silvain-sous-Toulx

References 

407 deaths
Gallo-Roman saints
Year of birth unknown
5th-century Christian martyrs